N. Prabhakaran is a noted short story writer, novelist, poet, playwright, essayist, educationist, editor and columnist in Malayalam. The eldest of the five children born to N Kunhambu and A Kalliani, Prabhakaran was born at Parassinikkadavu in Kannur district of Kerala on 30 December 1952. He spent his childhood days at Madayi.   Prabhakaran studied at Madayi L P School, Govt. High School, Madayi, Payyannur College and Government Brennen College, Thalassery. He served as a lecturer at the Dept. of Malayalam of Lekshmipuram college of Arts and Science, Neyyoor, Kanyakumari District, Tamil Nadu, University College, Thiruvananthapuram, CKG Memorial Govt College, Perambra, and Govt Brennen College, Thalassery, and retired while serving as the Head of the Malayalam Department of Brennen College. The writer also served as a visiting professor of Malayalam at the University of Calicut. Prabhakaran resides at Dharmadam in Thalassery.

Literary career
Though N Prabhakaran began writing in 1966, he established himself as a writer with the short story "Ottayante Pappan", published in 1971. The story won the first prize in the short story competition for college students conducted by Mathrubhumi Azhchappathippu, the Malayalam general interest weekly, in connection with its Vishu special.

Now N Prabhakaran has 48 books, spanning a number of genres, to his credit.

List of works
 Short story collections
 
 Marupiravi 
 
 Parakkum Paravathani (1996)
 Katha 
 Mayamayan 
 
 Bhoomiyude Attathu (2011)
 Ittarciyile Sooryan (2008)
 
 Rameswaram (2015)
 
 Marupiraviyum Mattu Kathakalum  (Marupiravi and Other Stories) (2016)
 
 
 Rameswaravum Mattu Kathakalum (Rameswarm and Other Stories) (2019)
 Sooryan Valare Aduthayirunnu (Sun was so Close) (2020)

 Novellas
 
 Janthujanam (1987)
 Bhoothabhoomi (1995)
 Adrusyavanangal (1998)
 
 
 
 

 Novels
 
 
 
 
 

 Anthology of poems
 Kalnada (2004)
 
 Kakka (2012)

 Play
 Pulijanmam (1987)
 Maranakkinar (1990)

 Travelogue
 

 Screenplays
 
 Pigman

 Collections of essays
 
 
 Maunathinte Muzhakkangal (2005)
 Nanmayute Mamaram (2007)
 Azhathil Vecha Kallukal (2012)
 
 Kavithayude Kathal (2017)
 Ezhuthinte Swadesam (2018)

 Collections of speeches
 Pathu Prabhashanangal (2016)

 Memoirs

 Ittittipullu (2018)

 Autobiography
  Njan Mathramallatha Njan is being serialised from November 2020 in Truecopy Web Magazine.

 Children's literature
 Manas Enna Sanchari (A Traveller Called Manas) 2021.

 Literary Study
 Sathyathil Ninnum Soundharyathilekkulla Dhooram Ethrayanu? (How Far is Beauty from Truth?) (2021)

 Miscellaneous
 Atmavinte Annam (The Food of the Soul) (2021)

Edited works
 Editorial Core Committee Convener of  Nammude Sahityam, Nammude Samooham (1901-2000) (Our Literature, Our Society (1901-2000) published by the Kerala Sahitya Akademy in 4 volumes.
 General Editor of the collected works of eminent scholar M.N.Vijayan, published by Current Books, Trichur, in 2001. The revised edition of the same work is to be published by the State Institute of Language soon.
 Editor of the souvenir published in connection with the 125th anniversary of Govt Brennen College, Thalassery, in 2016
 Guest Editor of Samayam Magazine published from Kannur

Awards
 "Ottayante Pappan" – won the first prize in the short story competition for college students conducted by Mathrubhumi weekly in connection with the Vishu Special (1971)
 Pulijanmam won the first prize in the state level drama competition conducted by Kerala Sangeetha Nataka Akademi (1987)
 Pulijanmam won Cherukad Award and the Kerala Sahithya Akademi Award (1987)
 The film Pulijanmam based on the drama of the same name won the National Film Award for Best Feature Film in 2006
 The short story "Pigman" won the Katha (New Delhi) Award (1994)
 Pattiam Gopalan Smaraka Award (1995)
 The short story collection Rathrimozhi won Kerala Sahithya Akademi Award (1996)
 The short story collection Mayamayan won V.K.Unnikrishnan Memorial Award (2000)
 Novel Thiyyor Rekhakal won the first EMS Memorial Award of Munnad EMS Smaraka Trust (2005)
 U P Jayaraj Award (2007)
 Novel Jeevante Thelivukal won Melur Damodaran  Sahithya Puraskaram (2008)
 Thiranjetutha Kathakal (Selected Stories) won the first Vaikom Muhammad Basheer Smaraka Sahithya Award (2009)
 Novel "Janakdha" bagged Malayattoor Award (2010) 
 21st Muttathu Varkey Memorial Award (2011)
 The short story "Kulipathalam" won the Padmarajan Award 2017 
 Alakkode Sargavedi-Navarathna Award-2019
 The novel 'Mayamanushyar' won the Odakkuzhal Award-2019 
 Crossword Book Award for Diary of a Malayali Mad Man, translated by Jayasree Kalathil- 2020
 Dharmadam Bank M P Kumaran Award 2023 for the author's comprehensive contribution to Malayalam literature

School of Literature
An informal literature appreciation course to enrich the literary sensibility of readers and provide them meaningful insights on various genres of literature, literary movements, objectives of literature, benefits of literature, evolution of literary forms and evolving trends in literature is offered by N Prabhakaran. The six-day talk series titled 'Sahithya Padasala' (School of Literature) started at Alakkode in Kannur district in July 2017 under the auspices of Alakkode Readers Forum is considered as the pioneering endeavor in Kerala offering informal education in literature. Classes, discussions and training in creative writing are provided by the writer. The school of literature was also launched at the writer's native place Madayi in August 2017

Translated Works
N Prabhakaran's stories were translated into many languages, including Tamil, Telugu, Tulu, Kannada, Marathi, Hindi, Urdu, English and German. The short story "Daivathinte Poombatta"(Butterfly of the God) is his most translated and most anthologized work.

HarperCollins India published his fiction in English 'Diary of a Malayali Madman' translated from Malayalam by Jayasree Kalathil in February 2019.

Harper Perennial India published his novel in English Theeyoor Chronicles translated from Malayalam by Jayasree Kalathil in April 2021.

Politics
Prabhakaran was associated with Leftist cultural and political organisations in early years. He was the first Kannur district secretary of Balasangam, one of the largest children organisations in India. He was the chairman candidate of Students' Federation of India (SFI) at Brennen College in 1974. Prabhakaran was also associated with the launching of Student magazine of SFI. During the period of The Emergency (India) Prabhakaran was part of the outfit Students for Human Rights. At present he is associated with All India Forum Right to Education. The writer dissociates from political affiliations of late.

Controversy
N. Prabhakaran's short story "Kaliyezhuthu" which was published in Mathrubhumi weekly in December 2017 invited vehement criticism from a section of school teachers in Kerala as the story was critical of the new pedagogy and the teachers' training sessions implemented in the state. While a section of teachers and educationists argued that the story exposed the pitfalls in the school education system, the others went on airing harsh comments on the writer that raised many concerns on freedom of expression.

References

External links 
 

1952 births
Living people
Indian male essayists
Indian male novelists
Indian male short story writers
Malayalam poets
Indian male dramatists and playwrights
Writers from Kerala
20th-century Indian novelists
People from Kannur district
20th-century Indian short story writers
20th-century Indian essayists
20th-century Indian male writers